Fausto Cuocolo (Tortona, 1930 – 2006) was an Italian jurist and politician. Cuocolo was amongst the most important Italian constitutionalist and one of the "fathers" of the Italian regionalism.

Life and academics 
When he was a student at Liceo Classico Giuseppe Mazzini in Genoa, he was actively involved in the fight against the Nazi-Fascismus. Later, he got a degree in law in Genova at age of 22 and in Political Science also two years later also with the highest mark and Laude for both. He became a member of the Democrazia Cristiana Italian party and of European JEF in Paris.Young European Federalists

In 1960 Cuocolo became Professor of Constitutional Law and in 1967 he published "La legge cornice nel rapporto tra Stato e Regione" (with the help of Giuliano Amato and Enzo Cheli), one of the most important books for the Italian regionalism. The most important amongst his books however is Istituzioni di diritto pubblico (Handbook of Public Law), a very common book in the Italian Law Schools. In 1970 Cuocolo was appointed director of political science faculty in Genova.

Italian Regionalismus 
Since the 50s Cuocolo made intense efforts in targeting the Italian Constitution in the direction of Regionalismus (giving more power to the Italian regions) through many essayes, papers and monographies. Prof. Cuocolo was also involved in the Statuto of the Regione Liguria, since before the birth of the region itself as a new public body.

Political life 
Furthermore, Cuocolo was involved in several prominent positions in the Italian public administration, in both Liguria and at the national level: e.g. he worked as a Law consultant for Italian Prime Ministers as Francesco Cossiga and others, and for the Council of Europe.

The Brigate Rosse attack 
The May 31, 1979 Prof. Cuocolo was attacked by the Brigate Rosse in his University during an exam: this was the first attack of the Brigate Rosse in a university. In 1981 a second attempt of attack was foiled on time by the Italian police.

Banks 
Cuocolo was also appointed Chief of Fondazione Carige and then of Banca Carige. However, he left the position in 2003 after having criticized some activities of the bank.

Books 
Cuocolo wrote 160 papers and 19 monographies.

Monograhpies 
Among them are:
 Il rinvio presidenziale nella formazione delle leggi, Milano, Giuffrè, 1955;
 Il Governo nel vigente ordinamento italiano, Milano, Giuffrè, 1959;
 Gli atti dello Stato aventi forza di legge, Milano, Giuffrè, 1961;
 Le leggi cornice nei rapporti tra Stato e Regioni, Milano, Giuffrè, 1967;
 Saggio sull'iniziativa legislativa, Milano, Giuffrè, 1971;
 Bicamerale: atto primo. Il progetto di revisione costituzionale, Milano, Giuffrè, 1997;
 Principi di diritto costituzionale, Milano, Giuffrè, 1999, 2ª edizione;
 Istituzioni di diritto pubblico, Milano, Giuffrè, 2003, 12ª edizione, ;
 Lezioni di diritto pubblico, Milano, Giuffrè, 2006, 4ª edizione.

Papers 
 I nuovi Statuti regionali fra Governo e Corte costituzionale, Giurisprudenza costituzionale, n. 6, 2004;

About Cuocolo 
About Prof. Fausto Cuocolo heritage in Law was published also the book:
 A.A.V.V., Studi in onore del Cuocolo Fausto (studies in honour of Fausto Cuocolo), Milano, Giuffrè, 2005. .

Recognitions 

Cavaliere di gran croce dell'Ordine al merito della Repubblica italiana – nastrino per uniforme ordinaria 	
Grande ufficiale dell'Ordine al merito della Repubblica italiana – nastrino per uniforme ordinaria

References

Italian jurists
1930 births
2006 deaths
20th-century jurists